"Bedtime Story" is a song by American singer Madonna from her sixth studio album, Bedtime Stories (1994). It was released as the third single from the album on February 13, 1995, by Maverick Records. The song was written by Björk, Nellee Hooper and Marius De Vries; it was the only time Björk wrote a song for a Madonna album. She re-wrote a demo of the song to the current version, which was then produced by Madonna and Hooper. A mid-tempo electronic and house song with acid, ambient and techno influences, "Bedtime Story" has an underlying skeletal synth melody influenced by minimal trance music. The track's unconventional, electronic sound was a departure from the pop-R&B-based tracks throughout the rest of the album. Lyrically, the song talks about the joys of the unconscious world.

"Bedtime Story" received favorable reviews from music critics, who praised the song's hypnotic and electronic style, and deemed it an underrated song which could have had great potential. Commercially, the single reached the top-ten in the record charts of the United Kingdom, Italy and Australia, but missed the top 40 in the United States, while peaking at number one on the Billboard Dance Club Songs chart. The accompanying music video for "Bedtime Story" was directed by Mark Romanek and is listed as one of the most expensive music videos of all time with a cost of $5 million ($ million in  dollars). It features surrealistic and new age imagery, with influences from artists such as Remedios Varo, Frida Kahlo and Leonora Carrington. The video received acclaim from critics and is permanently displayed at the Museum of Modern Art in New York City.

"Bedtime Story" was performed at the 1995 Brit Awards in London with Madonna wearing a silver Versace dress and long blonde extensions, becoming one of the 30 best moments of the awards show history according to Marie Claire. A remixed version of the song was also used as a video interlude on her Re-Invention World Tour in 2004. Critics and scholars noted that the song foreshadowed Madonna's move towards electronic music in her future work.

Background and release

According to Lucy O'Brien in her book Madonna: Like an Icon, Madonna wanted to "make an impact" on the soul music scene, and started working with prominent producers from the R&B market. Madonna also wanted to explore British club music scene, where genres such as dub had been growing in popularity. She decided to work with several European producers and composers from the electronic scene, including Nellee Hooper, who pleased Madonna due to his "very European sensibility". Inviting Hooper over to Los Angeles, writing sessions started taking place in Chappell Studios, Encino, California.

"Bedtime Story" was written by Hooper, Icelandic singer-songwriter Björk, and Marius De Vries, and co-produced by Madonna and Hooper. According to author Mark Pytlik in his book Björk: Wow and Flutter, Madonna was inspired at that time by Björk's album Debut (1993). Through her connections with De Vries and Hooper, Madonna got in touch with Björk and offered her a chance to write a track for Bedtime Stories. Björk did not consider herself a fan of Madonna's music, but she was intrigued by the offer and she accepted it.

Bjork stated in a live interview prior to the MTV music awards that she'd never met Madonna, and explained, "basically she asked my friend [Marius De Vries] for a song, and my friend asked me to help him... no offence to Madonna, but I did it more as a present to my friend".

Bjork wrote a song initially named "Let's Get Unconscious", with the opening lyrics "Today is the last day, that I'm using words"—the lines being born out of Björk's own criticism of Madonna's aesthetic. The singer clarified, "When I was offered to write a song for [Madonna], I couldn't really picture me doing a song that would suit her... But on second thought, I decided to do this to write the things I have always wanted to hear her say that she's never said."

Once the song demo had been finished, De Vries and Hooper rearranged the track and the final version was called "Bedtime Story". The song was eventually released as the third single from the parent album, Bedtime Stories, on February 13, 1995. Björk later confessed that Madonna had got few of the lyrics wrong — like, instead of the original "learning logic and reason", Madonna included it as "leaving logic and reason". The original demo was later re-worked and released as "Sweet Intuition", which appeared as a B-side on Björk's "Army of Me" single and remixed on the "It's Oh So Quiet" single.

On March 19, 2021, Madonna released the Bedtime Story EP to all digital and streaming outlets.

Recording and composition

"Bedtime Story" is an electronic song, a notable departure from the other tracks on its parent album, which are more R&B and new jack swing-driven. Unlike Madonna's more up-tempo, melodic work, the song is slower and has less melody but a more complex rhythmic structure. It has an ambient-influenced tone, with a "pulsating" and a "deep, bubbling" house beat. There are stylistic comparisons to acid house music with its "skeletal" synth arrangement, influences of minimal trance, as well as techno. The song's instrumentation is synthesized, consisting of drum machine loops, organs, strings, gurgles, handclaps, as well as a digitally-altered "homophonic" choir. According to sheet music published by Musicnotes.com, "Bedtime Story" is written in the key of G minor and has a moderate tempo of 108 beats per minute. Madonna's vocals span from the nodes of A3 to G5 and follows a basic sequence of Gm9–Dm–E–A–G as its chord progression. The song is linked to the ending of the previous album track, "Sanctuary", and starts with its chords. The ending of the track has a pulsating beat and a mix of the lead synth, with Madonna's voice whimpering and uttering "Ha-ha-aahs". It ends abruptly saying "And all that you've ever learned, try to forget, I'll never explain again" making the listener believe that it was all the part of a dream.

According to Victor Amaro Vicente in his book The Aesthetics of Motion in Musics for the Mevlana Celal ed-Din Rumi, the song's music bears many resemblances to new age-era music and different forms of Sufi music. Its slow atmospheric qualities have drawn comparison to "Mevlevi-Sufi Relaxation" and the song's intricate, "steady and continuous" rhythmic structure has also drawn comparison to the zikr ceremony. Björk, one of the song's writers, has been credited for giving the song its particular style and according to De Vries, the track's architecture is "distinctly Björkian" and she "has such a particular and idiosyncratic approach to the construction of lyrics and phrasing". In a chapter of Music and Technoculture written by Charity Marsh and Melissa West, it is stated that one can hear the influence of Björk in Madonna's vocals during the song.

Rikky Rooksby, author of The Complete Guide to the Music of Madonna, noted that the lyrics of "Bedtime Story" are a hymn to the joys of unconsciousness and a rejection of the supposed constraints of reason and language, hence the line "Words are useless, especially sentences, They don't stand for anything, How could they explain how I feel?" Lyrically, despite being a song about a trip to the unconscious, scholars have noticed subtexts within the song's meaning. Vicente noted that postmodernism and new age themes are prevalent within the lyrics, especially with regards to their incapability of articulating the concept of the truth, as well as the song's theme of meditation and relax. Islamic mystic and sexual themes have also been noted within the song's lyrics. Vicente further found that the cliché references to "honey", "longing and yearning", and the sexual connotations of being "wet on the inside" does not relate to "secular" love, but to "ecstatic" Sufi poetry. The lyrics allude to concepts of movement which are "central" to Sufi philosophy: "It indicates achieving fana through sema (getting 'lost' and 'leaving logic and reason to the arms of unconsciousness')".

Critical reception

"Bedtime Story" has received positive reviews from music critics. Peter Galvin from The Advocate found that the song "calls to mind the Ecstasy anthem 'Rescue Me'". Stephen Thomas Erlewine of AllMusic, in a review for the parent album, wrote that "Bedtime Story" was among the "best songs on the album" and that it "slowly works [its] melodies into the subconscious as the bass pulses". Larry Flick from Billboard noted, "It is easily among [Madonna's] boldest and most experimental pop singles to date" with "trippy and cutting-edge trance dance rhythms". He finished his review praising its "ingratiating" hook and "it is an affecting plea for unconscious bliss and escape, voiced with underplayed angst and resolve". Writing for Idolator, Bianca Gracie called "Bedtime Story" the highlight of the album, adding that "It sucks you in with its quivering drum patterns taken directly from trance music, which creates an ethereal ambiance". Gracie commended the influence of UK dance music and Madonna's provocative vocals, finding the song to be a direct inspiration for singer Britney Spears' "Breathe on Me", from her fourth studio album In the Zone (2003).

In his weekly UK chart commentary, James Masterton said that it's easily "the most credible single" Madonna has released since "Vogue". A reviewer from Music Week gave the song four out of five, stating that it "gives Madonna a vehicle for a mix of inviting vocals and an insistent sensual rhythm. One of the best songs on the album." James Hamilton from the RM Dance Update deemed it a "'let's get unconscious' whispered burbling throbber". Sal Cinquemani of Slant Magazine praised the song, claiming that it had unfulfilled potential and that it "could have been the next 'Vogue'". In a review for her GHV2 album, he also described the song as a "trippy follow-up to the mainstream hit 'Take a Bow'" and gave it an "A" rating. O'Brien wrote that "'Bedtime Story' was a vivid track that foreshadowed Madonna's move towards electronica". Author Victor Amaro Vicente wrote in his book, The Aesthetics of Motion in Musics for the Mevlana Celal Ed-Din Rumi, that the song's "complex rhythmic texture" made it a "dance hall favorite in the mid-1990s". Rikky Rooksby wrote in The Complete Guide to the Music of Madonna, that the track was similar to the music of English alternative band Everything but the Girl, and claimed that "in contrast to most other songs of the album, this is one track that could have been longer and more trippy than it is".

Matthew Rettenmund wrote in his Encyclopedia Madonnica that the song was a "total curveball" because of its inclusion on the album. He also believed that releasing it as a follow-up single to the commercially successful "Take a Bow" diminished its potential. However, Rettenmund praised it as one of Madonna's most "uncharacteristic" songs, describing as a "hypnotic, almost hallucinogenic, ride through an idealized state of mind." This was echoed by author Chris Wade, who wrote in the book The Music of Madonna that although written by Björk, Madonna made the song her own by "adding a druggy, sleepiness [to it] that makes it one of her most unusual, quirky and challenging tracks." Jude Rogers from The Guardian was more critical, saying that "as gorgeously hypnotic as it is, it sounds too much like Björk"; nonetheless, she placed the song at number 53 on her ranking of Madonna's singles, in honor of her 60th birthday. Pitchforks Owen Pallett compared it negatively to Björk's "Violently Happy" and deemed it "disappointing—sterile and static". In August 2018, Billboard picked it as the singer's 44th greatest single, calling it "a bizarre choice for a third single [...] Its lightly flickering beat and moaning synths were pitched at a very radio-unfriendly midtempo minimalism, and Björk's anti-lyric about eschewing words hardly rate as Madonna's most rousing".

Commercial performance
In the United States, the song debuted at number 72 on the US Billboard Hot 100, on the issue dated April 22, 1995 and it sold 12,000 units in its first-week. One week later, the song peaked at number 42, becoming the first Madonna single since "Burning Up" (1983) not to reach the top 40. If "Bedtime Story" would have been able to reach the top 40, Madonna could have become the third woman in the "rock era" with the most top 40 hits, behind Aretha Franklin and Connie Francis. She would have achieved a consecutive string of 33 top 40 hits, starting from her single "Holiday" (1983). Fred Bronson from Billboard explained that the song's loss of radio airplay and sales prevented it from peaking within the US top 40. "Bedtime Story" spent a total of seven weeks on the Billboard Hot 100. However, it was successful on the US Hot Dance Club Songs chart, where it peaked at number one and spent 16 weeks on the charts. Furthermore, it also charted on various Billboard genre charts, including the Rhythmic Top 40 at number 40, and the Top 40 Mainstream at number 38. On the Canadian RPM Top Singles chart, it reached a peak of number 42.

In the United Kingdom, the song entered the UK Singles Chart at its peak of number four on the week of February 25, 1995. It left the top 20 two weeks later, eventually spending nine weeks on the charts. In other European countries, the song also found some success. It peaked at number 38 in Belgium for one week only. On the Dutch Single Top 100 chart, it entered and peaked at number 46 on April 15, 1995, and stayed on the same position the next week, with a total run of two weeks. "Bedtime Story" debuted at number nine in Finland, and peaked at number four the next week. In Australia, the song debuted and peaked at number five on April 9, 1995, where it stayed in that position for three weeks. It fell out of the top ten in the fifth week, and eventually exited the charts after a total run of nine weeks, falling to 44 on its last week in the charts. In New Zealand, it debuted at number 40 on May 7, 1995, moving up two positions to 38 which was its peak, and leaving the charts the next week.

Music video

Background and development

The accompanying music video for "Bedtime Story" was directed by Mark Romanek over a course of six days at Universal Studios, Universal City, California. Madonna had first approached Romanek to direct the music video of her Erotica single, "Bad Girl" (1993). Romanek recalled in the DVD, The Work of Director Mark Romanek, that "Bad Girl" was ultimately directed by David Fincher, but Romanek agreed to direct "Rain," the final video from Erotica. He was then approached by the singer's team and asked to work on "Bedtime Story."

Romanek contacted storyboard artist Grant Shaffer to create the storyboards for the video. He met with Romanek the next day, who played "Bedtime Story" for Shaffer and also showed him some photographs of Madonna, which were supposed to be used as the album cover. The surrealism inspired images portrayed a mystical looking Madonna, with white hair billowing behind her. Romanek wanted to have the music video capture the same look. Madonna called from Florida and together with Romanek they described to Shaffer every aspect of the video, including budget and their concepts. For the next few days, Shaffer sketched the storyboards and faxed them to Romanek for review. About 20 days later, Shaffer dropped the final sketches at Propaganda Films, who were producing the video.

Production started from December 5, 1994, at Universal Studios. When Shaffer arrived there, he found that his storyboards were glued on a giant blackboard along with the schedule for each shot. He also observed that many of his storyboard ideas had evolved, but they retained the core concepts. The preliminary shots used a Madonna body double and the singer arrived afterwards, proceeding with the shots in a water tank. Filming stopped for few hours when a minor earthquake shook the film studio. Few complications were encountered like Madonna getting dyed in blue color from sitting in the water tank, as well as technical difficulties leading to cancellation of a storyboard showing the singer opening her chest cavity. One shot involving Madonna lying in the lap of a skeleton had to be postponed since the skeleton was too small for the singer, and had to be rebuilt from scratch. The last scene filmed was the one involving the laboratory where Madonna was shown sleeping in a futuristic dress.

Making the clip reportedly cost US$5 million (US$ million in ), making "Bedtime Story" one of the most expensive music videos of all time. It was the most expensive video at the time of its release, alongside the clip for her single "Express Yourself" (1989). Tom Foden was the video's production designer and it was shot by cinematographer Harris Savides, on 35 mm film lens. Due to the vast number of digital effects required for the video, post-production lasted for weeks. In an interview with Aperture magazine, Madonna revealed the inspiration for the music video:
My "Bedtime Story" video was completely inspired by all the female surrealist painters like Leonora Carrington and Remedios Varo. There's that one shot where my hands are up in the air and stars are spinning around me. And me flying through the hallway with my hair trailing behind me, the birds flying out of my open robe – all of those images were an homage to female surrealist painters; there's a little bit of Frida Kahlo in there, too.

Release and synopsis

On March 10, 1995, the video was given a cinematic release at three different Odeon Cineplex film theaters; in Santa Monica, California at the Broadway Cinemas, in Manhattan, New York at the Chelsea Theater, and in Chicago, Illinois at the Biograph Theater. To promote the video, Madonna did a special known as Madonna's Pajama Party on March 18, 1995. where the singer could be seen reading a bedtime story in Webster Hall in New York City. Unlike most of Madonna's videos which debuted on either MTV or VH1 television channels, "Bedtime Story" was first put into circulation on radio station Z100 following the singer's "pajama party" on March 18. According to Maverick GM Abbey Konowitch, they first aligned with Odeon Cineplex so that they could assure that the music video would be viewed in an innovative way. However, Konowitch and his team were aware that such an event could not be organized for every release because it would cause problems with investments. Odeon VP Freeman Fisher explained that since it was a slow theatrical season, allowing the video's release enabled them to sell more tickets, "for four minutes the audience sees astounding cinematic images in a first class feature-like production. It's not just another artist lip-syncing to a track."

The music video starts off with a blue monitor screen with an eye showing the inscription "Welcome". The video progresses inside a blue space ship-style room with Madonna lying prostrate in what seems to be a scientific experiment. The imagery cast in this section of the video have drawn comparisons to hermeticism. The video progresses into a sequence of dreams, containing varied surrealistic, mystic, new age, Sufi and Egyptian imagery and symbolism. Such include a scene in which Madonna lies on a rotating sunflower, and images of a woman with long hair, an alchemist-type man holding a cube with brunette-haired Madonna's face on each side as well as rotating Sufi dancers. The dream sequence progresses with unusual clips, including Madonna in a pool with half-visible skulls. A scene in which Madonna, dressed in a light dressing gown, gives birth to doves, can also be seen; the image has been compared to the work of René Magritte and Kahlo's 1932 painting My Birth. Next shot shows her sleeping and laying on the lap of a skeleton with skull, who hugs her. Suddenly, she floats down a corridor in a white gown and her blonde hair trails behind her and appears in a black-and-white projection in a cinema-like room. She appears spotting brunette hair and commands something. As the music gets more dramatic, the dream grows intense, the singer can be seen wading through space with her blonde hair trailing behind her again, the images of skulls and scars appearing and the singer being scared. A scene in which Madonna's eyes are placed with mouths and her mouth with an eye precedes the ending, influenced by the work of Kahlo; the final shots show Madonna waking up and looking out.

Reception and analysis

The music video for "Bedtime Story" has received generally positive reviews from critics ever since its release. It was exhibited and permanently kept in different art galleries and museums, including the Museum of Modern Art as well the School of Visual Arts in New York City. O'Brien praised the video, calling it "one of [Madonna]'s most experimental" music videos and a "Dalí-esque epic", causing it to enter "the portals of high art". MTV News' James Montgomery, while writing an article on the pop culture references of Britney Spears' "Hold It Against Me" music video (2011), claimed that "Bedtime Story" was an ultra artistic video, influencing Spears' one. Corinna Herr wrote in the book Madonna's Drowned Worlds that "Visual references to surreal paintings seem to be a key to Madonna's world of images" and listed "Bedtime Story" as one of these videos. In the same book, author Santiago Fouz-Hernández added that videos like "Bedtime Story" included alchemical and hermeticist traditions, in particular the concepts of androgyny and masquerade. Herr also wrote regarding the video's new age influences and concept of an idealised world, one "which she is not necessarily a part, but to which she nevertheless seems to be attracted". Rettenmund commented that the video was rife with mystical and Sufi traditions, and described it as a "singular creation in Madonna's oeuvre".

The music video has also drawn comparisons to Tarsem Singh's films, The Cell (2000) and The Fall (2006), in the sense that they both incorporate elements of Islamic mystic imagery, such as in the scene where the Sufi dance is executed, as well as the floating cube. According to writer Brad Brevet, who observed the similarities, deduced that both the video and the films deal with tapping into the subconscious of the human mind and hence the resulting strange visuals were directly an influence from "Bedtime Story". James Steffen, author of The Cinema of Sergei Parajanov, found that some of the imagery in the video were directly lifted from the 1969 Soviet film, The Color of Pomegranates, including the scenes showing a bare foot crushing grapes over a slab inscribed with Arabic, and a scene showing a bishop's croziers falling into hand. Steffen also noted that Romanek's influences for the video included the works of Russian film director Andrei Tarkovsky, including Stalker (1979) and Nostalghia (1983). Jake Hall from Dazed declared "Bedtime Story" as the blueprint for "90s brand of futurism", adding that the video "eschews the obvious and instead relies on undulating CGI". It can be found on the Madonna compilations, The Video Collection 93:99 (1999) and Celebration: The Video Collection (2009).

The music video for "Bedtime Story" was published on Madonna's official YouTube channel in October 2009. It has amassed more than 7.7 million views as of September 2021.

Live performances and legacy
The Junior Vasquez single remix of the song was performed at the 1995 Brit Awards. Madonna wore a Versace Spring/Summer 1995 silver silk evening dress, with long blonde extensions. She even invited Björk to feature in the performance; the singer turned it down, saying "I was supposed to get [Madonna's] personal number and call her up, but it just didn't feel right. I'd love to meet her accidentally, really drunk in a bar. It's just all that formality that confuses me". It was described by Music Week as a "flamboyant performance". The performance was ranked number four on Marie Claires "30 Best Brit Award Moments" list. It was described by the magazine as the "best opening performance" at the Brits. A writer described that "[Madonna] pulled out all the stops, treating the audience to a light show and trio of satin-clad male dancers".

Madonna has only featured the song on one of her concert tours, the 2004 Re-Invention World Tour, where elements of the Orbital remix were used as a video interlude. As the video played, three acrobatic dancers dropped from the ceiling on swings. Madonna appeared in the video wearing a white costume while singing in front of a mirror and lying down on a big scanner. A white horse can be seen with her during the video riding on a white desert and running through white sheets. As the interlude ended, Madonna appeared on stage again to sing "Nothing Fails" (2003).

"Bedtime Story" has been cited as one of the songs with the most unfulfilled potential in Madonna's career; nonetheless, the song did enjoy some success, being a club "favorite" in the mid-1990s. It has been described as the record that foreshadowed Madonna's usage of electronic music in her later work, especially Ray of Light (1998), which according to Vicente, owes "its contemplative and electronic techno rave character to 'Bedtime Story'." O'Brien wrote in Madonna: Like an Icon, that the song "foreshadowed [the singer's] move towards electronica". De Vries recalled that tackling the song "seemed to set something free in Madonna. She was straining at the leash a little bit, to find some other languages to speak, and 'Bedtime Story' was an embryonic moment that went a lot further on to the next few albums." In a review for the Bedtime Stories album on a whole, Sal Cinquemani of Slant Magazine wrote that the song was "the germ that would later inspire Madonna to seek out and conquer electronica with the likes of William Orbit and Mirwais". While ranking Madonna's 60 best singles, Chuck Arnold from Entertainment Weekly listed "Bedtime Story" at 54, calling it an "important" song in the singer's catalogue as, according to the author, it provided a "jumping-off point for the avant-garde electronica of Ray of Light". Arca stated: "This song in particular and its video hit me hard and then stroked me soft, presented an infrastructure of widescreen unapologeticness so empowering that to this day, when the song starts, I smile from ear to ear and want to lick my own skin".

Track listings and formats

US 7-inch, CD, and cassette single
 "Bedtime Story" (Album Version) – 4:53
 "Survival" (Album Version) – 3:33

US CD maxi-single
 "Bedtime Story" (Album Edit) – 4:08
 "Bedtime Story" (Junior's Wet Dream Mix) – 8:35
 "Bedtime Story" (Junior's Dreamy Drum Dub) – 9:34
 "Survival" (Album Version) – 3:33
 "Bedtime Story" (Orbital Mix) – 7:44
 "Bedtime Story" (Junior's Sound Factory Mix) – 9:18
 "Bedtime Story" (Junior's Single Mix) – 4:53

US 12-inch vinyl
 "Bedtime Story" (Junior's Sound Factory Mix) – 9:18
 "Bedtime Story" (Junior's Sound Factory Dub) – 8:19
 "Bedtime Story" (Orbital Mix) – 7:44
 "Bedtime Story" (Junior's Wet Dream Mix) – 8:35
 "Bedtime Story" (Junior's Wet Dream Dub) – 7:30

UK and European 12-inch vinyl
 "Bedtime Story" (Junior's Sound Factory Mix) – 9:18
 "Bedtime Story" (Junior's Sound Factory Dub) – 8:19
 "Bedtime Story" (Junior's Wet Dream Mix) – 8:35
 "Bedtime Story" (Orbital Mix) – 7:44

UK cassette single
 "Bedtime Story" (Album Edit) – 4:08
 "Bedtime Story" (Junior's Single Mix) – 4:53

UK limited edition storybook CD single
 "Bedtime Story" (Junior's Single Mix) – 4:53
 "Secret" (Allstar Mix) – 5:10
 "Secret" (Some Bizarre Mix) – 9:48
 "Secret" (Some Bizarre Single Mix) – 4:17

UK, European and Australian CD maxi single
 "Bedtime Story" (Album Edit) – 4:08
 "Bedtime Story" (Junior's Wet Dream Mix) – 8:35
 "Bedtime Story" (Junior's Dreamy Drum Dub) – 9:34
 "Bedtime Story" (Orbital Mix) – 7:44
 "Bedtime Story" (Junior's Sound Factory Mix) – 9:18

Digital single (2021)
 "Bedtime Story" (Album Edit) – 4:08
 "Bedtime Story" (Junior's Wet Dream Mix) – 8:35
 "Bedtime Story" (Junior's Dreamy Drum Dub) – 9:34
 "Survival" (Album Version) – 3:33
 "Bedtime Story" (Orbital Mix) – 7:44
 "Bedtime Story" (Junior's Sound Factory Mix) – 9:18
 "Bedtime Story" (Junior's Single Mix) – 4:53
 "Bedtime Story" (Junior's Sound Factory Mix Edit) – 4:19
 "Bedtime Story" (Junior's Sound Factory Dub) – 8:19
 "Bedtime Story" (Junior's Wet Dream Dub) – 7:31
 "Bedtime Story" (Lush Vocal Radio Edit) – 4:42
 "Bedtime Story" (Lush Vocal Mix) – 6:47
 "Bedtime Story" (Luscious Dub Mix) – 7:38
 "Bedtime Story" (Percapella Mix) – 6:31
 "Bedtime Story" (Unconscious in the Jungle Mix) – 6:26

Credits and personnel
Credits and personnel are adapted from the Bedtime Stories album liner notes.

 Madonna – lead vocals, producer
 Björk – songwriter
 Marius De Vries – producer
 Nellee Hooper – songwriter, producer
 Frederick Jorio – mixing
 P. Dennis Mitchell – mixing
 Robert Kiss – assistant engineer
 Joey Moskowitz – programming
 Paolo Riversi – cover art, photographer, designer
 Michael Penn – designer

Charts

Weekly charts

Year-end charts

See also
 List of number-one dance singles of 1995 (U.S.)
 List of most expensive music videos

References

Bibliography

External links
 

1994 songs
1995 singles
Madonna songs
Music videos directed by Mark Romanek
Sire Records singles
Song recordings produced by Madonna
Song recordings produced by Nellee Hooper
Songs written by Björk
Songs written by Marius de Vries
Songs written by Nellee Hooper
Music videos shot in the United States